Richard "Dickie" Ewen (born 24 August 1937) was a Scottish former professional footballer, who played for Aberdeen FC, Forfar Athletic FC, and subsequently for several Highland Football League Clubs.

Ewen began his professional career in 1957 when he joined Aberdeen from local club Banks O' Dee. He made over 100 appearances for Aberdeen before joining Forfar Athletic in 1962. Upon leaving Forfar, he signed for Highland Football League Club Peterhead FC, followed by both Keith FC, and  Rothes FC, also both Highland League Clubs.

Ewen won a Scottish Cup runners-up medal in 1959 when he played in Aberdeen's 3–1 defeat to St Mirren.

References

1937 births
2001 deaths
Footballers from Aberdeen
Association football wingers
Scottish footballers
Aberdeen F.C. players
Forfar Athletic F.C. players
Peterhead F.C. players
Scottish Football League players
Banks O' Dee F.C. players
Scotland under-23 international footballers